Henry Lumley was a British soldier and Governor of Jersey.

Henry Lumley may also refer to:

Henry Lumley, Viscount Lumley (c. 1685–1710), British nobleman and politician
Henry de Lumley (born 1934), French archeologist, geologist and prehistorian
Henry Ralph Lumley (1892–1918), First World War pilot and burn victim

See also
Harry Lumley (disambiguation)